Haajara Abdul Kareem was a Maldivian actress, writer, director and producer mostly known for her villainous and comical roles in feature films.

Career
Haajara played the role of Jameela, a poor woman who struggles in a second marriage, in Ahmed Sharmeel and Ibrahim Waheed's family drama film Dhon Manma (1992) alongside Ibrahim Shakir and Sharmeel. The film tells the story of a step-mother who strives to create a bond with her step-children. Also, she starred opposite Reeko Moosa Manik, Hassan Afeef, Niuma Mohamed and Mariyam Nazima in the Easa Shareef directed Emme Fahu Dhuvas (1997) which follows a devious woman who sunders her best-friend's upcoming marriage by creating false accusations and staging misleading impressions.

Hamid Ali's Badhal was released in 1996, in which she starred alongside Ali, Niuma Mohamed, Hussain Sobah and Waleedha Waleed which follows a series of events caused by the misunderstanding by a "non-existent" twin. She also played the ruthless step-mother who abuses and traumatizes her step-daughter which garnered her critical acclaim for the performance. The dialogues she used in the film were considered to be the "most iconic dialogues" in the history of Maldivian cinema.

In 2000, Kareem played the role of Ruqiyya, a gluttonous woman and a local medicine practitioner who forced her step-daughter to marry a wealthy old businessman in Abdul Faththaah's television drama series Dhoapatta. Starring alongside Mohamed Shavin, Jamsheedha Ahmed, Niuma Mohamed and Sheela Najeeb, the series centers on unrequited love and complications of a relationship within and beyond marriage. The same year, she wrote and directed a family drama, Ajaaib besides starring in it alongside Ahmed Asim, Mariyam Nazima, Koyya Hassan Manik and Waleedha Waleed which depicts the relationship of two exemplary wives and their respective families regardless of societal norms. In the film, she played dual roles of two siblings, an aged woman, Aisa Manike who let her only daughter weds a married man and a ruthless mother who tried to spoil the correspondence of two wives. The same year, she starred in another Amjad Ibrahim's direction, a comedy drama film, Majubooru Loabi (2000) opposite Mariyam Nisha and Yoosuf Shafeeu which focuses on a failing marriage of a comprehensive man and an emotionally immature woman.

In 2003, the Abdul Faththaah directed Aan... Aharenves Loabivin (2002) was released in which Kareem starred alongside Ali Seezan, Niuma Mohamed, Sheela Najeeb, Aminath Rasheedha and Neena Saleem where she played the mother of Suzy, an ill-fated girl who was forced to hide her marriage in-order to help her friend recovering from amnesia. Upon release, the film opened to positive response from critics and was a commercially successful project.

Her last film release was the Abdul Faththaah-directed critically acclaimed television series, Thiyey Mihithuge Vindhakee (2003) which was considered as one of the best series production in television industry. She was applauded for her performance as the villainous mother who is ready to take extreme measures to break her son's relationship with a girl from a middle-class family.

Death
On 13 June 2007, Kareem was pronounced dead at the age of 69. Her funeral prayer was performed at Aasahara Mosque.

Filmography

Film

Television

Accolades

References 

People from Malé
21st-century Maldivian actresses
Maldivian film actresses
Maldivian women film directors
Maldivian film directors